Here Comes the Bride is a 2010 Filipino comedy film starring Angelica Panganiban, Eugene Domingo, Tuesday Vargas, Jaime Fabregas, Tom Rodriguez, and John Lapus. It was released by Star Cinema.

The film had international screenings in select cities in the United States such as in San Francisco, CA, Milpitas, CA, Vallejo, CA, Los Angeles, CA, Bergenfield, NJ, and Guam

Synopsis
A freak accident causes five very different individuals to swap souls right before a big wedding. Most of the souls are happy where they are - except for the bride, whose wedding is coming. As the five try to figure out and return to their bodies, they quickly learn to appreciate looking at life from a very different perspective.

Cast

The role of Toffee was initially offered to the fastest rising star that time Vice Ganda but his manager Ogie Diaz turned down the offer due to Vice's conflicts on schedule and Vice's also started shooting his launching movie Petrang Kabayo when the role was offered to him.

Angelica Panganiban as Stephanie/Stef, the conservative, shy bride who has saved her virginity for soon-to-be husband. (switched to Precy's body)
Eugene Domingo as Precy, a feisty, middle-aged, single lawyer, and Stephanie's godmother. (switched to Medelyn's body)
John Lapus as Toffee, a love-torn image stylist and part of the wedding's hair and makeup team. (switched to Stephanie's body)
Tuesday Vargas as Medelyn, an overworked nanny who takes care of the bratty kid, Iñaki. (switched to Lolo Bien's body)
Jaime Fabregas as Bien, the groom's rich and sickly but hypersexual grandfather. (switched to Toffee's body)
Tom Rodriguez as Harold, the groom.
Cherry Pie Picache as Doris, the mother of the bride.
Cai Cortez as Mariz, Stephanie's high school best friend and the maid of honor. She is enamored by and later marries Bien.
Timothy Chan as Iñaki, Medelyn's bratty charge and the wedding's ring bearer.
Ayen Munji-Laurel as Iñaki's mother
Neil Ryan Sese as Iñaki's father
Nico Antonio as Ding, Medelyn's, and later Precy's, suitor
Kim Atienza as himself (Kuya Kim). He helped the characters return to their own bodies.
Ricky Rivero as a makeup and hairstyling associate of Toffee
Ricci Chan as a makeup and hairstyling associate of Toffee
Johnny Revilla as Antonio, Bien's son and Harold's father
Bart Guingona as Rafael, Bien's son and Harold's uncle
Madeleine Nicolas as Linda, Precy's housekeeper
Cecil Paz as Bien's nurse
Thess Antonio as Vanessa, the wedding coordinator

Plot
On Stephanie's wedding day, her mother tells her that it is an auspicious day as a solar eclipse shall occur. Precy is a single, middle-aged, and feisty lawyer who is a godmother in the wedding. Medelyn is an overworked nanny preparing her bratty ward Inaki, who will be a ring-bearer. Bien, the sickly grandfather of the groom Harold, is paying for the wedding. Toffee, still embittered after a break-up, is part of the wedding's hair and makeup team.

As the wedding entourage makes their way to the venue in Batangas, they traverse the Magnetic Hill in Los Baños, Laguna. Soon, the solar eclipse happens and they meet a freak car accident. As they regain consciousness, they realize the body switch: Precy's soul goes to Medelyn's body; Medelyn's soul goes to Bien's body; Bien's soul goes to Toffee's body; and unfortunately for Stephanie, Toffee's soul goes to her body and her soul goes to Precy's body.

The souls in their new bodies nearly cause a ruckus right before the wedding: Precy, in Medelyn's body, disciplines her ward and gets a chance with love with the driver, Ding; Medelyn, in Bien's body, is amazed with how she is treated in comfort because of his age and money; Bien, in Toffee's body, is sexually renewed and enamors Mariz, the maid of honor, after accidentally wrecking her makeup; Toffee, in Stephanie's body, takes advantage of his new female physique; while Stephanie, in Precy's body, races time, distance, and confinement in a lunatic asylum to make save her wedding, which pushes through without incident.

After the wedding, Stephanie and Harold gathers Precy, Medelyn, Bien, and Toffee, and seek help from Kuya Kim Atienza to fix the body switch. Precy, Medelyn, Bien, and Toffee, however, are apprehensive as they seem happy with the new bodies and circumstances they are in. Kuya Kim explains that the switch is because of the soul displacement due to the eclipse at Magnetic Hill. He cautions that the souls may only revert to their original bodies if they would recreate the accident on the same hill during the next solar eclipse, which will happen in two years. While waiting, all of them decide to stay together in one house except for Toffee, who is locked up after trying to flee the resort in Stephanie's body.

Two years pass and they recreate the accident. On the first attempt, Stephanie has the soul of Medelyn, Precy has the soul of Bien, Medelyn has the soul of Toffee, Toffee has the soul of Precy, and Bien has the soul of Stephanie. On the second attempt, Stephanie has with the soul of Bien, Precy has the soul of Toffee, Bien has the soul of Precy, Toffee has the soul of Medelyn, and Medelyn has the soul of Stephanie. When they attempt for the third time, Stefanie has the soul of Precy, who has the soul of Medelyn, who has the soul of Bien, who has the soul of Toffee, who has the soul of Stephanie. They then attempt a fourth time, successfully but leaving them hospitalized with injuries from the successive crashes. At the hospital, Precy hires Ding as her new driver, Medelyn is comforted by a now docile Inaki, Toffee despairs over returning to his body until a group of young male nurses assist him, Bien introduces Mariz to his grown-up children as their new mother, and Stephanie and Harold try to share a romantic moment but fall down their beds after being worn down by their casts.

At the end of the movie, it is explained that the quintet's souls have been connected from the beginning of humans in the Philippines.

Reception

Critical response
The movie received positive reviews from viewers and critics. Philbert Ortiz Dy of ClickTheCity  gave the film 4 stars out of 5, stating: "Here Comes the Bride is one of the best comedies I’ve seen all year." ReelAdvice rate the film 4.5/5 saying, "Very, very funny. We can bet that you won’t be able to count the number of times you’ll laugh out loud" the site also praise the cast stating," talented powerhouse cast was really brilliant."

In 2010, It was said  to be believed the Box Office Summer Blockbuster internationally running for 3 months through theaters and was successful in DVD and Home Video Sales distributed by Star Home Video due to its critically acclaimed performances.

Box office
Its first day gross totaled to ₱12 million, according to the report that was shown in SNN: Showbiz News Ngayon. According to Box Office Mojo, the film had grossed P42.1 million on its weekend debut, beating Iron Man 2 in Philippine Box-Office. The film's fifth week debut totaled to P117 million.

Sequel
According to an article on Philippine Entertainment Portal, a sequel was in production due for a middle of 2012 release.

Awards

References

External links
Here Comes the Bride Official Website

2010 films
2010s fantasy comedy films
Philippine fantasy comedy films
Films about weddings
Star Cinema comedy films
OctoArts Films films
Body swapping in films
2010 comedy films
Films directed by Chris Martinez